Badnogo may refer to:

Badnogo, Bazèga, Burkina Faso
Badnogo, Ganzourgou, Burkina Faso